Oflag IV-C, often referred to by its location at Colditz Castle, overlooking Colditz, Saxony, was one of the most noted German Army prisoner-of-war camps for captured enemy officers during World War II; Oflag is a shortening of Offizierslager, meaning "officers' camp".

Colditz Castle
This thousand-year-old fortress was in the heart of Hitler's Reich,  from any frontier not under Nazi control. Its outer walls were seven feet (two metres) thick and the cliff on which it was built had a sheer drop of two hundred and fifty feet (75metres) to the River Mulde below.

Timeline
The first prisoners arrived in November 1939; they were 140 Polish officers from the September Campaign who were regarded as escape risks. Most of them were later transferred to other Oflags.

In October 1940, Donald Middleton, Keith Milne, and Howard Wardle (a Canadian who joined the RAF just before the war) became the first British prisoners at Colditz.
On 7November, six British officers, the "Laufen Six", named after the camp (Oflag VII-C) from which they made their first escape, arrived: Harry Elliott, Rupert Barry (later Sir Rupert Barry), Pat Reid, Dick Howe, Peter Allan, and Kenneth Lockwood. They were soon joined by a handful of British Army officers and later by Belgian officers. By Christmas 1940 there were 60 Polish officers, 12 Belgians, 50 French, and 30 British, a total of no more than 200 with their orderlies.

200 French officers arrived in February 1941. A number of the French demanded that French Jewish officers be segregated from them and the camp commander obliged; they were moved to the attics. By the end of July 1941, there were more than 500 officers: over 250 French, 150 Polish, 50 British and Commonwealth, 2 Yugoslavian. In April 1941, a French officer, Alain Le Ray, become the first prisoner ever to escape from the Colditz Castle.

On 24 July 1941, 68 Dutch officers arrived, mostly members of the Royal Dutch East Indies Army, who had refused to sign a declaration that they would take no part in the war against Germany. According to the German Security Officer, Captain Reinhold Eggers, the Dutch officers appeared to be model prisoners at first. Importantly for other internees in the camp, among the 68 Dutch was Hans Larive with his knowledge of the Singen route. This route into Switzerland was discovered by Larive in 1940 on his first escape attempt from an Oflag in Soest. Larive was caught at the Swiss border near Singen. The interrogating Gestapo officer was so confident the war would soon be won by Germany that he told Larive the safe way across the border near Singen. Larive did not forget and many prisoners later escaped using this route.

Within days after their arrival, the Dutch escape officer, Captain Machiel van den Heuvel, planned and executed his first of many escape plans. On 13 August 1941 the first two Dutchmen escaped successfully from the castle, followed by many more of whom six officers made it to England. Afterwards a number of would-be escapees borrowed Dutch greatcoats as their disguise. When the Wehrmacht invaded the Netherlands they were short of material for uniforms, so they confiscated anything available. The coats in Dutch field grey in particular remained unchanged in colour, since it was similar to the tone already in use by the Germans, thus these greatcoats were nearly identical with very minor alterations.

In May 1943, the Wehrmacht High Command decided that Colditz should house only Americans and Commonwealth. In June the Dutch were moved out, followed shortly thereafter by the Poles and Belgians. The final French group left 12 July 1943. By the end of July there were a few Free French officers, and 228 Commonwealth officers including Britons, Canadians, Australians, New Zealanders, South Africans, Irish, and one Indian.

On 23 August 1944 Colditz received its first Americans: 49-year-old Colonel Florimund Duke — the oldest American paratrooper of the war, Captain Guy Nunn, and Alfred Suarez. They were all counter-intelligence operatives parachuted into Hungary to prevent it joining forces with Germany. Population was approximately 254 at the start of the early winter that year.

On 19 January 1945 six French Generals — Lieutenant-General Jean Adolphe Louis Robert Flavigny, Major-General Louis Léon Marie André Buisson, Major-General Arsène Marie Paul Vauthier, Brigadier-General Albert Joseph Daine, and Brigadier-General René Jacques Mortemart de Boisse — were brought from the camp at Königstein to Colditz Castle. Major-General Gustave Marie Maurice Mesny was murdered by the Germans on the way from Königstein to Colditz Castle.

On 5 February, Polish General Tadeusz Bór-Komorowski, deputy commander of the Armia Krajowa (Home Army) and responsible for the Warsaw Uprising, arrived with his entourage.

In March, 1200 French prisoners were brought to Colditz Castle, with 600 more being imprisoned in the town below.

When the final battles of the war approached the area, the prisoners became concerned at the danger, both from the SS in the town who may kill them, or from the approaching Allied forces who may mistakenly attack the castle. To prevent this the prisoners persuaded the German guards to surrender to them in secret and prevent the SS from entering. This was successful and on 16 April 1945 Oflag IV C was captured by American soldiers from 1st US Army.

"Prominente" and notable inmates
Among the more notable inmates were British fighter ace Douglas Bader; Pat Reid, the man who brought Colditz to public attention with his post-war books; Airey Neave, the first British officer to escape from Colditz and later a British Member of Parliament; New Zealand Army Captain Charles Upham, the only combat soldier ever to receive the Victoria Cross twice; and Sir David Stirling, founder of the wartime Special Air Service.

There were also prisoners called Prominente (German for 'celebrities'), relatives of Allied VIPs. The first one was Giles Romilly, a civilian journalist who was captured in Narvik, Norway who was also a nephew of Winston Churchill's wife Clementine Churchill. Adolf Hitler himself specified that Romilly was to be treated with the utmost care and that:

 The Kommandant and Security Officer answer for Romilly's security with their heads.
 His security is to be assured by any and every exceptional measure you care to take.

When the end of the war approached, the number of Prominente increased. Eventually there were Lord Lascelles and John Elphinstone, nephews of King George VI and Queen Elizabeth; Captain The Lord Haig, son of World War I Field Marshal Douglas Haig; Lord Hopetoun, son of Lord Linlithgow, the Viceroy of India; Lieutenant John Winant Jr., son of John Gilbert Winant, US ambassador to Britain; Tadeusz Bór-Komorowski, commander of Armia Krajowa and the Warsaw Uprising; and five other Polish generals. British Commando Michael Alexander claimed to be a nephew of field marshal Harold Alexander in order to escape execution, but was merely a distant cousin.

Micky Burn, another well-known inmate of Colditz, was a British commando captured at Saint-Nazaire. Burn had been a journalist like Romilly before the war, working for The Times. Burn had briefly been an admirer of the Nazi Party and in 1936 had met Adolf Hitler, who signed his copy of Mein Kampf. After war broke out Burn shifted politically to Marxism and gave lectures to prisoners at Colditz, but due to his pre-war interest in Nazi philosophy he was widely regarded with distrust and scorn.

John Arundell, 16th Baron Arundell of Wardour (1907–1944) was an aristocrat held at Colditz who, despite his pedigree, was not awarded Prominente status. Arundell made a habit of exercising in the winter snow; he contracted tuberculosis and died in Chester Military Hospital.

Another officer, not listed as among the Prominente but who became famous after the end of the war, was French military chaplain and Catholic priest Yves Congar, who was captured as a POW and later sent there after repeated attempts to escape. He became a noted theologian and was made cardinal in 1994, at age 90.

At 1:30 a.m. on 13 April 1945, while the final battles of the war approached the area, the Prominente were moved under guard and the cover of darkness, over the protestations of the other prisoners. The Allies were concerned that the Prominente might be used as hostages, bargaining chips and human shields, or that the SS might try to kill them out of spite. But they reached the American lines alive a couple of weeks later, an action aided by the SS head of POW camp administration Obergruppenführer Gottlob Berger, which contributed to his lessened sentence after his war crimes verdict in 1949.

German staff and visitors

Keeping the castle running in a secure and efficient manner was a difficult task, and the Germans maintained a larger garrison at the castle than at many of their other prison camps. Between 1939 and 1945 more than 70 German officers and enlisted men worked in a wide variety of staff positions, as well as overseeing prisoners' labour.

There was also a large contingent of civilians and local townspeople who worked on the castle grounds. Some were in maintenance, some in medical roles, some were there in a supervisory role (Nazi Party leaders, Swiss Red Cross observers, etc.). Some family members of the German military officers lived at the camp.

Security officers
 Captain Paul Priem was the first Security Officer. Pat Reid said he "possessed a rare quality among Germans – a sense of humour".
 Captain Reinhold Eggers was Security Officer from November 1940 until April 1945, promoted to chief of security in 1944. He was also the only English-speaker among the Germans at Colditz, thus was involved in every interaction with the prisoners or between the Senior Officers and the Kommandant serving as translator. Dutchman Lieutenant Damiaen J. van Doorninck said of him, "This man was our opponent, but nevertheless he earned our respect by his correct attitude, self-control and total lack of rancour despite all the harassment we gave him."

Kommandants
 Oberst Schmidt 1939 – August 1942
 Oberst Glaesche 1 August 1942 – 13 February 1943
 Oberst Prawitt 14 February 1943 – 15 April 1945

Life in the camp
In Colditz, the Wehrmacht followed the Geneva Convention. Would-be escapees were punished with solitary confinement, instead of being summarily executed. In principle, the security officers recognized that it was the duty of the POWs to try to escape and that their own job was to stop them. Prisoners could even form gentlemen's agreements with the guards, such as not using borrowed tools for escape attempts.

Most of the guard company was composed of World War I veterans and young soldiers not fit for the front. Because Colditz was a high security camp, the Germans organized three and then later four Appells (roll calls) per day to count the prisoners. If they discovered someone had escaped, they alerted every police and train station within a  radius, and many local members of the Hitler Youth would help to recapture any escapees.

Because of the number of Red Cross food parcels, prisoners sometimes ate better than their guards, who had to rely on Wehrmacht rations. Prisoners could use their relative luxuries for trade and, for example, exchange their cigarettes for German Reichsmarks that they hoped could later use in their escape attempts. Occasionally this turned out to be a mistake as several of the bills they received were of the earlier Papiermark varieties that were no longer considered valid. There were also other currencies in circulation, including the Registermark, used for travelling and investments in Germany; the Reisemark, for tourists; the Kreditsperrmark, for sales of property belonging to foreigners; the Effektensperrmark, arising from the sale of securities in Germany; the Reichskreditkassenschein in occupied territories; and the Behelfszahlungsmittel (Auxiliary Payment Certificates) for the German Armed Forces. The Kreditsperrmark and Effektensperrmark were consolidated into the Handelsperrmark in 1939. Because of the massive variety of currency types and uses, in several escape attempts, escapees with one of these various currencies printed before 1939 were told their money was no good — leaving them moneyless and easier to recapture.

Prisoners had to make their own entertainment. In August 1941 the first camp Olympics were organized by the Polish prisoners. Events were held in football (soccer), volleyball, boxing, and chess, but the closing ceremony was interrupted by a German fire drill. "The British came in last place in every event cheerfully, to the dismay of the other participants who took the competition deadly seriously," according to the British inmate John Wilkens in a 1986 interview. Prisoners also formed a Polish choir, a Dutch Hawaiian guitar band, and a French orchestra.

The British put on homemade revues, classical plays and farces including: Gaslight, Rope, The Man Who Came to Dinner, Pygmalion, and The Importance of Being Earnest. Several prisoners intentionally grew their hair long so as better to portray female roles. Prisoner Jock Hamilton-Baillie used to shave his legs, rub them in brown shoe polish, and draw a line down the back of his legs in pencil to simulate the appearance of silk stockings. This allowed him special "bath privileges" in the German guards washroom, since the prisoners' showers were unable to get the polish off his legs. Staging these plays even gained the prisoners access to "parole tools", tools which were used to build the sets and promised not to be used to escape. During the summer months, the theatre's peak periods, there were new productions every two weeks. The biggest success of the theatre however was the Christmas-themed Ballet Nonsense which premiered on November 16, 1941, and ran until the November 18, 1941 show which Hauptmann Priem (the first prison warden of Colditz) attended.

Another pastime which occupied much of the prisoners' time was the production of moonshine alcohol. Initially started by the Polish contingent using a recipe of yeast, water, German jam and sugar from their Red Cross parcels, and then taken up by other prisoners, it did not take long for stills to be secreted all across Colditz (one of which remained undiscovered until a tourist trip in 1984). Prisoner Michael Farr, whose family ran Hawker's Gin (the sole purveyors of Sloe gin with a Royal Warrant), managed to make a sparkling wine dubbed "Château Colditz". Some prisoners would get black teeth or even temporary blindness from consuming this beverage — a condition known as "jam-happy" — as it contained many impurities. Although the German guards despised the drunken prisoners, they generally turned a blind eye to the distilling.

Officers also studied languages, learning from each other, and told stories. Most popular of these stories were the embellished retelling of BBC broadcasts by Jim Rogers. Since mail was regularly screened by censors, and the German newspapers received by prisoners contained much Nazi propaganda, the only reliable information prisoners could obtain on the progress of the war in Europe was through BBC broadcasts received via one of two radios which were secreted in the castle. These radios were smuggled in by French prisoner Frédérick Guigues and named "Arthur 1" and "Arthur 2". The first radio was quickly discovered because of a mole, but the second remained secreted until Guigues returned and removed it during a tour of the castle in 1965. The prisoners' "Radio Laboratory" was not permanently exposed until 1992 during repairs to the roof.

Later the most popular way to pass the time was stoolball, a particularly rough version of rugby, where there were two stools at either end of the prisoners' courtyard and goals were scored by touching the opponent's stool with the ball. This game served as an outlet for pent-up aggression, and also provided noise to cover the sounds of tunnel-digging.

In addition to escape attempts, prisoners tried to make the life of their guards more miserable by resorting to "goon-baiting", making nuisances of themselves by harassing the guards. For example, they would drop water bombs on the guards. Douglas Bader encouraged his junior officers to do the same. British Flight Lieutenant Pete Tunstall especially tried to cause havoc by disturbing the roll call even if nobody was trying to escape, so that the guards would not become suspicious when somebody was. He went through a total of five courts-martial and suffered a total of 415 days in solitary confinement.

Escape attempts

In popular culture
Oflag IV-C provided the inspiration for both television and film because of the widely popular retellings by Pat Reid and Airey Neave. This started as early as 1955 with the release of The Colditz Story, followed by The Birdmen in 1971, continuing until 2005 with the Colditz mini-series. The escape stories of Colditz Castle have inspired several board and video games, such as Escape from Colditz and Commandos. In contrast, the existence of Colditz is virtually unknown in Germany today. Eggers wrote a book based on his experiences of the German side of events.

Cinema
 The Colditz Story (1955) was a dramatic film re-enactment of life in the camp during World War II, based entirely on the books of Pat Reid, directed by Guy Hamilton for a British Academy of Film and Television Arts Award in 1956. It has been called an "Outstanding factual World War Two drama about Allied POW's held in Germany's most secure wartime prison."

Television and TV movies
 Escape of the Birdmen (1971) was a television movie loosely based on Pat Reid's book. This movie is of note in that it is the first movie based on Pat Reid's books to reference the Colditz glider, devised and built by Bill Goldfinch with Jack Best his partner in the construction.
 Colditz (1972–1974) was a television drama series aired on BBC1 television. It ran for a total of 28 episodes across two seasons, progressing in time from the opening of the camp until its liberation in 1945. The first three episodes of the series acted as an introduction to the plot of the show, and introduced the viewers to the three central characters by following the events that led up to their arrival at the camp. The series was a joint production between the BBC and Universal TV (an American company), but for reasons unknown, it never aired in the United States. Episodes 24 "A Very Important Person" and 25 "Chameleon" did however air in the US as a two-hour TV movie entitled Escape From Colditz, in 1974. A review of the film was printed in the newspaper The News Of The World, which praised it saying: "It has all the realism, dignity and courage of the men it commemorates." Its more notable actors include Jack Hedley as Lieutenant Colonel John Preston from 1972–74, Edward Hardwicke as Captain Pat Grant from 1972–73, Robert Wagner as Major Phil Carrington from 1972–74, David McCallum as Flight Lieutenant Simon Carter from 1972–74, and Dan O'Herlihy as Lieutenant Colonel Max Dodd in 1974.
 Escape from Colditz (2001) was a British Channel 4 television documentary.
 Colditz (2005) was a mini-series on ITV1, based on Henry Chancellor's book Colditz: The Definitive History, directed by Stuart Orme. This tale is much more fictional than its predecessors, with fictional characters and situations that are merely based on real people and events. It features Jason Priestley (Beverly Hills, 90210) as Rhett Barker, James Fox as Lt. Col. Jimmy Fordham, Damian Lewis (Band of Brothers) as Lt. Nicholas McGrade, Tom Hardy (Black Hawk Down) as Lt. Jack Rose, Sophia Myles (Thunderbirds) as Lizzie Carter, Guy Henry as Capt. Sawyer and Timothy West as Warren.
 In PBS's NOVA documentary series, "Escape From Nazi Alcatraz" (Season 41, Episode 12), is about a planned escape by a group of British officers from Colditz Castle.

Fiction
The Colditz Legacy, Guy Walters, Headline, London, 2005, 
Yes, Farewell, Michael Burn, Jonathan Cape, London, 1946 
The Narrow Door at Colditz, Robert L. Wise, Broadman & Holman Publishers, Nashville, 2004, 
Revenge of the Damned, Chris Bunch and Allan Cole, Del Rey Books, New York, 1989,   features an escape from a thinly-veiled "Koldyeze prison" clearly modelled on Colditz.

Games
 Escape from Castle Colditz — a board game from Invicta Games in 1972.
 Escape from Colditz — a board game from Parker Brothers in 1973. This game was designed by Pat Reid and later re-designed by Gibson Games in the 1980s and as Skedaddle! by Crowhurst Games in 1992 and re-released again in 2011.
 Escape from Colditz — a 1991 video game developed by Digital Magic for the Commodore Amiga, was based on the Parker Brothers board game.
Prisoner of War has two levels set in Colditz.
Commandos 2: Men of Courage — the mission, Castle Colditz, is based on the same castle and involves assisting the escape of all allied prisoners in the castle.
 The Colditz Story — a 1987 video game published by Atlantis Software for the ZX Spectrum

Music
 Melbourne band "Colditz Glider" is named after the construction of a glider to escape Oflag IV-C. The group draws parallels between the prisoners drawn together to escape and the band creating music to escape.

Other media
The Doctor Who audio play Colditz by Big Finish is based in Colditz, with the Seventh Doctor's companion Ace mentioning several well-known names and escape attempts.

See also
 MI9
 Christopher Hutton

References

Sources

External links

VirtualColditz.com — Videos and photos of Colditz Castle as it is today.
Virtual Tour of Colditz — Site is predominantly in German, some sections have an English translation.
NOVA "Nazi Prison Escape" — Homepage to the NOVA TV episode "Nazi Prison Escape"
Bibliographie par Frédéric Mortimore — Site is in French but has a good list of books available about Colditz and its POW's.
Colditz Castle — Oflag IVc — POW Information Sources — Links to resources about German POW's and has links to obituaries for some former prisoners.
Escape to Colditz by Andrew Walker — BBC News Magazine 8 August 2003.
ColditzCastle.Net Oflag IVc & Colditz — A definitive history & guide to visiting: large photo gallery, then & now
Colditz Castle Oflag IVC — English language tour and history of Colditz.
Escape from Colditz — Channel 4 web game whose object is to escape from Colditz Castle.
The Colditz Prison Escape Glider — How to make your own Colditz Glider with plans.
Colditz Oflag IVc The ‘Bad Boys’ Camp — Site with additional information and many links
Karl Höffkes German film archive Newsreel from a private archive: Two minutes of film of the castle and prisoners starts at timestamp 10:14:37

POW memoirs
The Indian war hero who stood up to the Nazis — About Captain Birendra Nath Mazumdar M.D. the only Indian POW at Colditz.
Mémoires de ma captivité Jacques Pallu (1940–1944) — Site is predominantly in French, some sections have an English translation.
No.218 Squadrons Home Run — The Escape of Flight Lieutenant Wardle R.A.F From Colditz Castle.
Une Vie De Camp (1943) — This is an exhibition of the watercolours of Pierre Lelong showing daily life at Oflag IVc. These watercolours seem "sanitized" and may have been censored by the German guards.

Audio interviews
From the Imperial War Museum (IWM) oral history collection:
 
Tucki was a Polish officer served with 44th Infantry Regt in Poland, 1939; POW in Oflag VII A, Murnau, Germany, 1939–1941; escaped to Hungary, 1941 and returned to German captivity; POW in Oflag IV C, Colditz, Oflag 10 C Lubeck and Oflag 6 B, Dessel in Germany, 1942–1945
 
Lorne Welch was a British NCO flying instructor in GB, 1938–1942; officer with 25 Operation Training Unit, RAF in GB, 1942; POW at Stalag Luft III, Sagan and Oflag IV C, Colditz in Germany, 1943–1945
 
Dominic Bruce served as navigator with Bomber Command, 1939–1941; POW in Spangenburg Castle and Oflag IV C, Colditz in Germany, 1941–1945
From all IWM collections:

Prisoner obituaries
 James de Deane Yule: September 17, 1916 – December 25, 2000 – obituary
 John William Best: 1913 – April 22, 2000 — John William Best
 Dominic Bruce: June 7, 1915 – February 12, 2000 — obituary
 Hugh Bruce: January 26, 1919 – January 9, 2003 — obituary
 James Hugh Cecil (Jim) Chesshire: December 28, 1916 – October, 2000 — obituary
 Hugo Ironside: June 14, 1918 – October 3, 2008 — obituary
 Douggie Moir: August 24, 1918 – May 6, 2008 — obituary
 Francis Steinmetz: 20 September 1914 – 2 January 2006 — obituary
 Pete Tunstall: 1 December 1918 – 27 July 2013 — obituary
 Patrick Palles Lorne Elphinstone Welch: 12 August 1916 – 15 May 1998 — obituary

Oflags
Colditz Castle